Dictate can refer to:
 Dictation (disambiguation)
 Dictator
 Edict